Darren Andrews (born August 5, 1995) is an American former professional football player who was a wide receiver. He played college football for the UCLA Bruins and signed with the New England Patriots after going undrafted in the 2018 NFL Draft.

College career 
Andrews hauled in 162 passes for 1,977 yards and 15 touchdowns and rushed seven times for 76 yards and one touchdown in 41 games played with the UCLA Bruins, Andrews also had four kick returns for 81 yards, and five punt returns for 34 yards.

Professional career

New England Patriots
Andrews signed with the New England Patriots as an undrafted free agent on May 11, 2018. He was waived and put on reserve/non-football injury list on May 14, 2018 after clearing waivers. Andrews won Super Bowl LIII when the Patriots defeated the Los Angeles Rams 13-3. He was released on March 4, 2019.

Calgary Stampeders
On September 30, 2019, Andrews was added to the Calgary Stampeders practice roster. He was released on October 26, 2019.

Coaching career

References 

1995 births
Living people
American football wide receivers
Calgary Stampeders players
New England Patriots players
Players of American football from California
Sportspeople from Pomona, California
UCLA Bruins football players